Protector class may refer to:
 ,  Hong Kong Police patrol vessel
 ,  Armed Forces of Malta and Hong Kong Police patrol vessel based on the Damen Stan 2600 design
 ,  United States Coast Guard patrol vessels based on the Damen Stan 2600 design
 , or Lake-class,  Royal New Zealand Navy patrol vessels
 ,  Royal New Zealand Navy patrol vessels

See also
 Protector (ship)